The Chilean Ice and Inline Hockey Federation (FCHLH) is the governing body of ice and inline hockey in Chile.

See also
Chile national ice hockey team
Chile national inline hockey team

References

External links
IIHF profile
Federación Chilena de Hockey en Línea y en Hielo at Facebook

Ice hockey governing bodies in South America
Inline hockey in South America
International Ice Hockey Federation members
Ice